was a political party in Japan.

History
It's founded on November 9, 1945, mainly by former members of Seiyukai Party. Its first leader was Ichirō Hatoyama. In 1946-1947 and 1948-1954, the next party leader Shigeru Yoshida was the Prime Minister.

Leaders

Election results

House of Representatives

House of Councillors

References

Works cited
 

1945 establishments in Japan
Political parties established in 1945
Defunct political parties in Japan
Conservative parties in Japan
Defunct conservative parties
Political parties disestablished in 1948
1948 disestablishments in Japan